Charles Nugent Lentaigne (26 April 1901 - 6 November 1981) DSO was a Royal Navy officer who commanded HMS Gurkha (F63/G63) during the Second World War.

References 

Charles
Military personnel from Dublin (city)
Royal Navy personnel of World War II
Royal Navy officers of World War II
Companions of the Distinguished Service Order
1901 births
1981 deaths